Richard A. McClatchey, Jr. (November 6, 1929 – February 26, 2004) was a Republican member of the Pennsylvania House of Representatives.

References

Republican Party members of the Pennsylvania House of Representatives
1929 births
2004 deaths
20th-century American politicians